Serpent Lake is a lake in Crosby and Deerwood, Crow Wing County, in the U.S. state of Minnesota spanning 1,103 acres. Fish that swim there include:  Black Bullhead, Bluegill, Brown Bullhead, Largemouth Bass, Northern Pike, Pumpkinseed, Rock Bass, Smallmouth Bass, Walleye, Yellow Bullhead and Yellow Perch. Serpent Lake is an English translation of the Ojibwe language name.

See also
List of lakes in Minnesota

References

Lakes of Minnesota
Lakes of Crow Wing County, Minnesota